Moses at the Rock of Horeb, Moses and the Water from the Rock of Horeb or Moses Striking the Rock is a 1669-1670 or 1670–1674 oil on canvas painting by Bartolomé Esteban Murillo, still in the Hospital de la Caridad in Seville for which it was originally painted. It was restored in 2018.

References

Paintings by Bartolomé Esteban Murillo
Paintings depicting Moses
Paintings in Seville
1670s paintings